The 1984 Trans America Athletic Conference baseball tournament was held at Centenary Park on the campus of Centenary College of Louisiana in Shreveport, Louisiana, from May 13 through 15. This was the sixth tournament championship held by the Trans America Athletic Conference, in its sixth year of existence.  won their first tournament championship.

Format and seeding 
At the end of the conference regular season, the top two finishers in each division advanced to the tournament with each division winner playing the runner up from the opposite division in the first round of the double-elimination tournament.

Bracket

All-Tournament Team 
The following players were named to the All-Tournament Team. No MVP was named until 1985.

References 

Tournament
ASUN Conference Baseball Tournament
Trans America Athletic Conference baseball tournament
Trans America Athletic Conference baseball tournament